Kichkalnya is a Tatar village in the Nurlatsky district of the Republic of Tatarstan in Russia.

Etymology 
The name of the village Kichkalnya comes from the word , which translates as 'nettle', due to the fact that a lot of nettles grew on the territory of the village. Previously, it was probably called , which in translation means 'small'. In pre-revolutionary sources it is also mentioned under the name 'Vershina rechki Marasa' (the top of the Marasa river).

History 
According to old residents, the village of Kichkalnya was formed at the beginning of the 18th century. From stories passed down from generation to generation, the village was founded by three families who came from the Chuvash village of Uzeevo (now Aksubayevsky District). Mullah Tohvatullah was among the first founders of the village. According to legend, these families fled from their homes, hiding from forced baptism after the conquest the Khanate of Kazan by Ivan the Terrible. In fact, the resettlement of several families from the village of Uzeevo is explained by intraregional resettlement, since Ivan the Terrible died back in 1584.

The existing historiographic literature provides contradictory information about the date of the village formation - from the mid-1650s to 1710. According to the legend, a certain name in 1911 claimed that the village "Morasa Bashy" was founded 300 years ago, that is, in 1611, but this is highly unlikely.
Until 1920, it was part of the Staro-Almetevskaya Volost of the Chistopol Uyezd of the Kazan Governorate.

At 18th - 1st half of 19th centuries residents belonged to the category of state peasants, performed lashman duty. They were engaged in agriculture, cattle breeding, brick, matting, cooperage, carpentry and wheel crafts.

Since 1920, it has been a part of the Chistopol Canton of the Tatar Autonomous Soviet Socialist Republic.
From 10.08.1930 in Bilyarsky, from 10.02.1935 in Telmansky, from 16.07.1958 in Bilyarsky, from 01.02.1963 in Oktyabrsky, from 10.12.1997 in Nurlatsky Districts.

The status and boundaries of a rural settlement are established by the Law Republic of Tatarstan dated January 31, 2005 No. 32-ZRT "On establishing the boundaries of territories and the status of the municipal formation" Nurlatsky Municipal District "and municipalities within it"

Population

Geography 
Kichkalnya is located on the Marasa River, northwest of 60 kilometers of the district center of the city of Nurlat, the height of the village center above sea level is 120 m.

Village plans

Climate 

The climate is temperate continental. Climate code according to Köppen-Geiger climate classification: Dfb.

Infrastructure 
At the beginning of the 20th century, two mosques, two madrasahs, a smithy, and ten small shops functioned.

At this point in the village of ten streets, there is a secondary school, a house of culture, a library, a mosque, kindergarten, feldsher-obstetric station, 2 shops, post office

A memorial complex to the participants of the Great Patriotic War was opened in Kichkalnya.

Gallery

Literature 
Tatarskaya entsiklopediya: in 6 vol. / Ch. ed. M.Kh. Khasanov, res. ed. G. S. Sabirzyanov. – Kazan: Institut Tatarskoy entsiklopedii AN RT, 2006. – T. 3: K–L. – 664 p. (Татарская энциклопедия: В 6 т. / Гл. ред. М.Х. Хасанов, отв. ред. Г. С. Сабирзянов. – Казань: Институт Татарской энциклопедии АН РТ, 2006. – Т. 3: К–Л. – 664 с.)

Famous personalities
Zigangir Razyapov, revolutionary
Fales Valeev
Talgat Galiullin

References

Links 
 
 
 
 
 

Nurlatsky District
Rural localities in Tatarstan
Chistopolsky Uyezd